K-Day or KDAY may refer to:

 KDAY, one of two synchrocasting radio stations, in Redondo Beach, California, USA
 KDEY-FM, one of two synchrocasting radio stations, in Ontario, California, USA
 Dayton International Airport, by ICAO code
 K-Days, an annual exhibition in Edmonton, Alberta, Canada
 K-Day, an annual event held at Michigan Technological University
 K-Day, the day on which a convoy system is due to be introduced on a convoy lane, a NATO military designation of days and hours